Namma Ooru Nayagan is a 1988 Indian Tamil-language film, directed by Yaar Kannan and produced by V. Anbukarasu. The film stars Ramarajan, Gautami and Sripriya.

Cast
Ramarajan as Jagan
Gautami as Revathi
Sripriya as Annam
Senthamarai as Muthu Manikkam
K. R. Vijaya as Lakshmi
Senthil as Vellaiappan
Kumarimuthu as Aarumugam
Kovai Sarala as Constable Vatsala
Kallapetti Singaram

Soundtrack
The music was composed by Rajesh Khanna.

References

External links
Full movie in Youtube

1988 films
1980s Tamil-language films